Anita Ho-Baillie is an Australian scientist who is the John Hooke Chair of Nanoscience at the University of Sydney. Her research considers the development of durable perovskite solar cells and their integration into different applications. She was named as one of the Web of Science's most highly cited researchers in 2019–2022.

Early life and education 
Ho-Baillie was attended Monte Sant'Angelo Mercy College in North Sydney. She was an undergraduate student at the University of New South Wales, where she studied electrical engineering. She remained at UNSW for her graduate studies, where she developed contacting techniques for buried contact solar cells. After earning her doctorate, Ho-Baillie joined the faculty at the UNSW as a Senior Research Fellow. In 2008, she was one of the team who developed the record-breaking efficiency for a silicon solar cell. The following year they showed a multi-cell architecture comprising the record-breaking silicon solar cell could convert 43% of sunlight into electricity, another world first. She eventually moved to perovskite solar cells, and in 2016 broke the efficiency record for large area devices (12.1%).

Research and career 
In 2016, Ho-Baillie was appointed Program Manager for Perovskite Solar Cell Research at the Australian Centre for Photovoltaics. She joined the faculty at Macquarie University as an associate professor in 2019, before moving to the University of Sydney as the John Hooke Chair of Nanoscience. She is particularly interested in the translation of perovskites into real-world devices, including their integration into double-glazed windows.

Ho-Baille was awarded a $2.5 million grant from the Australian Renewable Energy Agency to develop photovoltaics. She has worked to improve the durability of perovskite solar cells. Under stress, perovskite solar cells become unstable and release gas. Ho-Baille has made use of gas chromatography–mass spectrometry to identify the degradation pathways of perovskite solar cells. She showed it is possible to prevent degassing using a low-cost polymer-glass stack, which protects the perovskite solar cells from damage. In 2020 her perovskite solar cells passed rigorous heat and humidity tests. She has demonstrated that all inorganic perovskite quantum dots make for highly efficient photovoltaics, with good mechanical stability.

Awards and honours 
 2001 University of New South Wales Photovoltaics Thesis Prize
 2016 Lane Cove Council Citizenship Award in Leadership
 2019 Web of Science Highly Cited Researcher
 2020 Web of Science Highly Cited Researcher
 2021 Australian Museum Eureka Prize Finalist
 2021 Australian Research Council Future Fellowship
 2021 Web of Science Highly Cited Researcher
 2022 Web of Science Highly Cited Researcher
 2022 Warren Prize, Royal Society of New South Wales

Selected publications

References 

Living people
Year of birth missing (living people)
University of New South Wales alumni
People educated at Monte Sant'Angelo Mercy College
Academic staff of Macquarie University
Academic staff of the University of Sydney
Australian women scientists
Australian women academics